Eduardo Ricagni (born 29 April 1926-2010) was a professional football player and coach. A winger, at club level he won one Italian league title and was the top scorer of the Argentine Primera División in 1952. At International level he was born in Argentina but played for the Italy national team. He later became a coach in Greece.

Playing career

Club
Ricagni began his career in 1944 with Club Atlético Platense where he scored 22 goals in 35 games. In 1947 he joined Boca Juniors where he scored his only hat-trick and won his only trophy with the club on his debut in a 6–0 win against Federación Tucumana in the Copa Ibarguren 1944. He played a total of 52 games for Boca in all competitions, scoring 23 goals.

In 1949 he joined Chacarita Juniors where he scored 39 goals in 78 league games. He then moved across the Río de La Plata to Montevideo to play for relegation threatened Montevideo Wanderers, he scored 7 goals in 10 games during his brief spell in Uruguay to help the club avoid relegation.

In 1952 he returned to Argentina to join Huracán where he scored 36 goals in 41 games and became the league top scorer in 1952.

In 1953 he was signed by Juventus, he made his debut for the Italian club in a 1–0 home win against Udinese. He scored 17 goals in 24 league games for the club including a hat-trick in his penultimate game for the club in a 4–1 on 23 May 1954.

Ricagni joined A.C. Milan in July 1954 in preparation for the beginning of the 1954–55 season. He won the Italian championships with Milan in his debut season with the club.

Between 1956 and 1958 he played for AC Torino and he ended his playing career after a season with Catania of Serie B.

International
Ricagni was eligible to play for the Italy national team as his father Pietro had emigrated from Italy to Argentina in 1912. He was selected to play on three occasions between 1953 and 1955. He made his debut in a 3–0 home win against Czechoslovakia on 13 December 1953 in which he scored a goal.

Coaching career
He was coach of Greek club PAS Giannina in 1974.

Personal life
His son is Eduardos Kontogeorgakis.

Honours

Club
Boca Juniors
Copa Ibarguren: 1944
A.C. Milan
Serie A: 1954–55

Individual
Primera División Argentina topscorer: 1952 (28 goals)

See also 
 Oriundo

References

External links

 Profile at Historia de Boca
 Profile at mwfc.com
 Nazionale stats
 Profile at Encyclopedia del Calcio

1926 births
2010 deaths
Footballers from Buenos Aires
Argentine footballers
Italian footballers
Italy international footballers
Association football wingers
Club Atlético Platense footballers
Boca Juniors footballers
Chacarita Juniors footballers
Club Atlético Huracán footballers
Montevideo Wanderers F.C. players
Juventus F.C. players
A.C. Milan players
Torino F.C. players
Catania S.S.D. players
Argentine Primera División players
Serie A players
Serie B players
Argentine expatriate footballers
Expatriate footballers in Argentina
Expatriate footballers in Italy
Expatriate footballers in Uruguay
Argentine expatriate sportspeople in Uruguay
Italian expatriate sportspeople in Uruguay
PAS Giannina F.C. managers
Argentine football managers